The flaccid lanternfish (Metelectrona ventralis) is a species of oceanodromous lanternfish that has a lifespan of up to two years. It has been found in stomachs of Champsocephalus gunnari and Dissostichus eleginoides.

Distribution/habitat 

Description 

References 

Taxa named by Vladimir Eduardovich Becker
Fish described in 1963
Myctophidae